Lithomancy is a form of divination by which the future is told using stones or the reflected light from the stones. The practice is most popular in the British Isles.

History

The earliest verified account of lithomancy comes from Photius, the patriarch of Constantinople, who describes a physician named Eusebius using a stone called a baetulum to perform the ritual. However, some writers also claim that Helenus predicted the destruction of Troy using the ritual.

Practice

Lithomancy as a general term covers everything from two-stone and three-stone readings to open-ended stone castings utilizing an undetermined number of stones.

In one popular method, 13 stones are tossed onto a board and a prediction made based on the pattern in which they fall. The stones are representative of various concepts: fortune, magic, love, news, home life and the astrological planets of Mercury, Venus, Mars, Jupiter, Saturn, the sun, and the moon.

References

Divination